Aron Magner (born April 23, 1976) is a Philadelphia-based musician best known as the keyboardist and founding member of The Disco Biscuits. Magner and The Disco Biscuits have been instrumental in bringing live and studio improvisational, electronic-based music to the forefront of the live music scene and, increasingly, to popular culture.

Early life 
From a young age, Magner was classically trained on the piano. Magner was enrolled in the University of Pennsylvania before more aggressively pursuing a career as a musician.

Career 
Magner's early musical influences included jazz and classical music, and led him to formal piano training. Soon after, he discovered David Bowie, Pink Floyd, The Doors, and similar artists. All of these influences remain present and noticeable in Magner's style to this day and, ultimately, help steer the various bands and projects he is involved with.

After graduating from Lower Merion High School, Magner enrolled in the University of Pennsylvania, where Marc Brownstein and Jon Gutwillig had begun casually playing in musical jam sessions together. As a Philadelphia native, Magner's reputation as a talented jazz keyboardist preceded him, and it was not long before the three began playing fraternity parties and other social events, often under different names each night such as "Party Tent." This was the beginnings of The Disco Biscuits. To date, Magner is the only member of The Disco Biscuits to perform in all of the band's public performances.

In 1999, Magner and The Disco Biscuits founded the now-annual Camp Bisco music festival, which began with an attendance of 900 and had grown to a sold out capacity of 25,000 in 2011. It now features a number of headlining U.S. and international acts, and was featured in The New York Times and other publications as a model for bands in the changing music industry. The Disco Biscuits, through the creation of Camp Bisco, by headlining events at famed venues such as Red Rocks Amphitheatre amidst national touring, and by creating destination festivals such as Dominican Holidaze, have been instrumental in bringing live and studio improvisational, electronic-based music to the live music scene and to popular culture.

Magner has also contributed to, and been a member of, other bands such as: Conspirator, Electron, Spaga, Brain Damaged Eggmen, The Join, and Acoustic Again.

In late 2014 Magner joined Bill Kreutzmann's band Billy & the Kids. This was following performing with Kreutzmann at the 2014 Lockn Festival with a band billed as Bill Kreutzmann's Locknstep Allstars.

Charitable 
Magner serves on the Board of Directors of Philadelphia Young Playwrights, along with his father Alan, an organization that his mother Adele founded. The program features a "groundbreaking" curriculum to inspire students’ literacy, learning, and creativity through playwriting and a love of the arts.

Magner has been active in supporting a number of nonprofit organizations tied to the live music scene, including HeadCount. In March 2010, Magner and The Disco Biscuits performed a benefit concert at Brooklyn's Brooklyn Bowl which generated the revenue needed to fund and install a $30,000 solar energy system at Greenfield Elementary, a public school located in Center City Philadelphia. Magner and The Disco Biscuits were very involved with selecting the Greenfield project, and helped ensure its completion. The project was orchestrated by HeadCount. He also participated virtually in the High Holiday services streamed from the Relix Studio and Brooklyn Bowl via FANS.

References 

1976 births
Living people
American electronic musicians
Jewish American musicians
Free improvisation
American rock keyboardists
Musicians from Philadelphia
People from Lower Merion Township, Pennsylvania
Jewish rock musicians
Billy & the Kids members
University of Pennsylvania alumni
Lower Merion High School alumni
21st-century American keyboardists
21st-century American Jews